The 1952–53 Detroit Red Wings season was the Red Wings' 27th season.

Offseason

Regular season

Final standings

Record vs. opponents

Schedule and results

Playoffs

Player statistics

Regular season
Scoring

Goaltending

Playoffs
Scoring

Goaltending

Note: GP = Games played; G = Goals; A = Assists; Pts = Points; +/- = Plus-minus PIM = Penalty minutes; PPG = Power-play goals; SHG = Short-handed goals; GWG = Game-winning goals;
      MIN = Minutes played; W = Wins; L = Losses; T = Ties; GA = Goals against; GAA = Goals-against average;  SO = Shutouts;

Awards and records

All-Star teams

Transactions
The following is a list of all transactions that have occurred for the Detroit Red Wings during the 1952–53 NHL season. It lists which team each player has been traded to and for which player(s) or other consideration(s), if applicable.

See also
1952–53 NHL season

References

External links
 

Detroit
Detroit
Detroit Red Wings seasons
Detroit Red Wings
Detroit Red Wings